The women's 50 metres freestyle at the 2018 World Para Swimming European Championships was held at the National Aquatic Centre in Dublin from 13–19 August.  9 classification finals are held in all over this event.

Medalists

Results

S5

Final

S6
Heats
11 swimmers from 7 nations took part.

Final
Yelyzaveta Mereshko broke the world record in the women's 50m freestyle S6.

S7
Heats
Eleven swimmers for 9 nations took part.

Final
Denise Grahl broke the European record in the final round.

S8
Heats
12 swimmers from 11 nations took part.

Final

S9
Final

S10
Heats
12 swimmers from 8 nations took part.

Final

S11
Final
Maryna Piddubna broke the world record in the women's 50m freestyle S11.

S12
Final
There was a tie for the gold medal for Hannah Russell and Elena Krawzow in the women's 50m freestyle S12 final.

See also
List of IPC world records in swimming

References

50 metres freestyle